Men Diana Illa... (English: From Diana To...) is the 11th (Anida is not counted as a studio album) studio album by Lebanese singer Diana Haddad, released by in November 2008, continued along the lines established by her 2002 album Law Yesaloni.

Track listing

Credits and personnel

Production

 Vocals: Diana Haddad
 Master Mix: Hussam Kamal
 Digital Master: Nasha'at Nasser Al Deen-Egypt
 Sound engineering: Saber Qasam Allah, Waleed Al Najaar
 Strings: Mr. Azef Jmn, Mr. Aziz Al Masri
 Harmony: Sameer Alqatan, Waheed Mubarak
 Solo Saxophone: Wessam Khassaf
 Solo violin (Turkey): Morat Skariaw
 Recorded by: Nojoom Music Studios (UAE, Dubai)
 Supervised by: Bassam Al Turk
 Media classification: Morad Al Natsha
 Pictures by: Hekmat Wahbe
 Designed by: Stockad
 Production, distribution, publication supervised by: Pier Al Ashqar
 Produced, distributed, published by: Nojoom Music
 Special Thanks: Lebanese Fashion designer: Akl Fakeh, Abd Al Raheem Mouhammed, Hazem Faris, Nahla Al Fahad, Samir Haddad

Songs Charts

Sheft Itessalek

Rouh Ya Sghier

Shlon Ashofh

Diana Haddad albums
2008 albums
Khaliji albums